Édouard Lambert (born 1 September 1906, date of death unknown) was a French sports shooter. He competed in the 25 m pistol event at the 1936 Summer Olympics.

References

1906 births
Year of death missing
French male sport shooters
Olympic shooters of France
Shooters at the 1936 Summer Olympics
Sport shooters from Paris